West Ridge High School is a public high school (grades 9–12) located in Blountville, Tennessee which operates under the administration of Sullivan County Schools. It was founded as a merger of Sullivan South High School, Sullivan North High School, and Sullivan Central High School in 2021. Dr. Josh Davis was announced as principal in July 2020 and has presided since the opening of the school in August 2021.

History
West Ridge High School officially opened in 2021, becoming the first new public high school to be opened in Sullivan County since the formation of the Sullivan North and Sullivan South high schools in 1980. The construction of the campus, which spans over 300,000 square feet and is known as the Ridge, cost about $75 million. The construction of the new campus accompanied the closure of the Sullivan North and South high schools as well as Sullivan Central High School and accommodated students from those schools. The opening of the school was intended for August 2020, but though construction persisted in spite of the COVID-19 pandemic, it was nonetheless delayed for a year due to rain.

References

External links

  

Public high schools in Tennessee
Schools in Sullivan County, Tennessee
Blountville, Tennessee
2021 establishments in Tennessee
Educational institutions established in 2021